Skywalk GmbH & Co. KG is a German aircraft manufacturer based in Marquartstein, Bavaria. Founded by Manfred Kistler and Thomas Allertseder in 2001, the company specializes in the design and manufacture of paragliders in the form of ready-to-fly aircraft as well as paragliding harnesses. The company also makes kite surfing wings and promotional tents.

Manfred Kistler formerly worked for Swing Flugsportgeräte and Thomas Allerseder was a director of Betech.

The company is organized as a Gesellschaft mit beschränkter Haftung and Co. kommanditgesellschaft limited partnership.

History
The company's first glider was the Hype, an intermediate paraglider certified to DHV 1-2 standards. In 2003 the DHV 2 certified Cayenne was added to the line. By 2016 the company offered a full line of "classic" gliders as well as lightweight designs, mountain descent miniwings and a tandem design, the Join't for flight training.

Divisions
Flysurfer Kiteboarding
Kite surfing kites & boards
Skywalk Paragliders
Paragliders and harnesses
X-Gloo Creative Event Equipment
Promotional tents and trade show display equipment

Aircraft 
Summary of aircraft built by Skywalk:
Skywalk Arriba
Skywalk Cayenne
Skywalk Chili
Skywalk Hype
Skywalk Join't
Skywalk Masala
Skywalk Mescal
Skywalk Poison
Skywalk Spice
Skywalk Tequila
Skywalk Tonic
Skywalk Tonka
Skywalk X-Alps

References

External links

Aircraft manufacturers of Germany
Paragliders
German companies established in 2001
Manufacturing companies established in 2001
Companies based in Bavaria